The Jones Lectureship at Stanford University is a four-year teaching fellowship available to previous Stegner Fellows. The Lectureship is available in fiction and poetry and is intended to provide writers with the time and support needed to complete book-length literary projects. Jones Lecturers typically teach several undergraduate courses per year. The Lectureship is named for Richard Foster Jones, head of the Stanford English Department when Wallace Stegner founded Stanford's Creative Writing Program following the end of Second World War. The original $500,000 endowment for the Lectureship came from Dr. E. H. Jones, a Texas oilman and brother of Richard Foster Jones.

Other appointments available to former Stegner Fellows include the Marsh McCall Lectureship and the Draper Lectureship, each two-year appointments at Stanford University. The Marsh McCall Lecturer oversees the staffing and teaching of creative writing courses at Stanford Continuing Studies. It is named for Classics Professor Marsh McCall, former dean of Continuing Studies. Former Marsh McCall Lecturers include Julie Orringer, Stephen Elliott, Eric Puchner, Adam Johnson and Angela Pneuman. The Draper Lecturer primarily teaches undergraduate courses in creative non-fiction. It is named for Phyllis Draper and William Henry Draper III.

List of notable Jones Lecturers
Tobias Wolff
Keith Scribner
Bruce Snider
Georgina Beatty
Lysley Tenorio 
Austin Smith
Richie Hoffman
Hieu Minh Nguyen
William Brewer
Stephanie Vaughn
Allan Gurganis
Scott Turow
Rick Barot
Timothy Steele
Al Young
Gabrielle Calvocoressi
Tom Kealey
Adam Johnson
ZZ Packer
Tom Barbash
Ryan Harty
Scott Hutchins
Nan Cohen
Peter Campion
Daniel Orozco
Belle Randall
Dana Kletter
David Vann
Ed McClanahan
Ehud Havazelet
Skip Horack
Solmaz Sharif
Maria Hummel

References

Stanford University